Pânico na Band was a Brazilian comedy television show broadcast originally by the Band network from April 1, 2012 until December 31, 2017, produced in a partnership between Band and Jovem Pan, the latter being the owner of the show's format. This is the second television version of the radio show Pânico, succeeding Pânico na TV, which was broadcast by RedeTV! between 2003 and 2011.

Seasons 
The Pânico na Band has the same format of the older Pânico na TV, created in 2003, after the cast members of the homonym radio program wanting a greater disclosure of the show. Officially, was idealized by Antônio Augusto Amaral de Carvalho Filho (Tutinha), president of the Jovem Pan radio. Anchored by Emilio Surita, the show has the help of Marcos Chiesa, Wellington Muniz, Rodrigo Scarpa, Márvio Lúcio, Evandro Santo, Eduardo Sterblitch, Daniel Zukerman, Amanda Ramalho, Daniel Peixoto, Guilherme Santana, Fernanda Lacerda.

Notes

References

External links 
 

Rede Bandeirantes original programming
Brazilian comedy television series
2012 in Brazilian television
2017 in Brazilian television
Portuguese-language television shows
Brazilian parodists